The Escala and Corda'' XIV Professional League 04-05 of the Circuit Bancaixa is the top-level championship of the Valencian pilota, organized by the firm ValNet, on the Escala i corda variant.

It was played on several rounds. The first three ones were a league where teams tried to get as much points as possible. Every victory sums up 3 points, but if the loser team attains 50 jocs they sum up 1 point. The 4 teams who had the biggest scorings got qualified to the one-match semi-finals. The best two teams played a final match.

Teams
 Alcàsser
 Cervera, Voro and Oñate
 Benidorm
 Genovés II and Fèlix
 Pedreguer
 León and Sarasol II
 Petrer
 Pedro, Solaz and Jesús
 Sueca
 Ribera II and Dani
 València
 Núñez and Tino 
 Vila-real
 Mezquita, Tato and Canari
 Hidra-L'Eliana
 Álvaro and Salva

Feridors
 Miguelín and Pedrito

Replacing players
 Escalaters:
 Adrián I and Miguel
 Mitgers and punters:
 Bernat, Melchor, Serrano, and Raül II

Statistics

 1st Round 

2nd round

3rd round

Semi-finals

Final match

Honor gallery
 Champion:
 Vila-real'
 Mezquita, Tato and Canari
 Runner-up:
 Pedreguer
 León and Sarasol II

Seasons of the Circuit Bancaixa
 Circuit Bancaixa 05/06
 Circuit Bancaixa 06/07
 Circuit Bancaixa 07/08

References 

Valencian pilota competitions
Valencian pilota professional leagues